Of Snails and Men is a 2012 Romanian comedy film directed by Tudor Giurgiu.

Cast 
 Andi Vasluianu as George
 Monica Bîrlădeanu as Manuela
 Dorel Vișan as Vladimir
 Jean-François Stévenin as Robert
 Robinson Stévenin as Olivier
 Andreea Bibiri as Ana

References

External links 

2012 comedy films
2012 films
Romanian comedy films